The following is a list of clubs who have played in the Afghan Premier League since its formation in 2012 to the current season.

As of the 2020, eight teams have played in the Afghan Premier League.

Table
All statistics here refer to time in the Afghan Premier League only. Afghan Premier League teams playing in the 2021 season are indicated in bold, while founding members of the Premier League are shown in italics.

Location of all clubs who have competed in the Afghan Premier League

References
General
 

Afghan Premier League lists
Afghan Premier League clubs